Lawrence W. "Larry" Kellner (born January 19, 1959) is the former CEO of Continental Airlines, having succeeded Gordon Bethune as CEO in December 2004. Prior to his arrival at Continental, he served as the chief financial officer of American Savings Bank. Kellner retired as the airline's chief executive at the end of December 2009. During his career at Continental, he previously served as a vice president, chief financial officer and chief operating officer. Kellner currently serves as President of Emerald Creek Group, LLC - a Texas-based private equity firm primarily focused on real estate and also as Chairman of the board of directors of The Boeing Company.

Early life

Kellner was born in Worthington, Minnesota, and grew up in Sumter, South Carolina. He graduated from the University of South Carolina in 1981 with a degree in accounting. He resides in Austin, Texas.

Kellner is the 2008 recipient of the Tony Jannus Award for distinguished achievement in commercial air transportation. In July 2009, Continental announced Kellner's retirement as its CEO at the end of the year.

Career

Kellner is the prior vice chairman of the Greater Houston Partnership, and that organization's current chairman. Kellner was elected to Boeing's board of directors in 2011. He is a trustee of Rice University.

Kellner used to be a member of the National Executive Board of the Boy Scouts of America, the organization's governing body.

Awards and honors
Kellner was named Tony Jannus Award's Person of the Year for 2008.

References

1959 births
Living people
Continental Airlines people
American chairpersons of corporations
American airline chief executives
People from Sumter, South Carolina
University of South Carolina alumni
National Executive Board of the Boy Scouts of America members
American chief operating officers
American chief financial officers
20th-century American businesspeople
United Airlines people